Molleres is a village in Andorra, located in the parish of Canillo.

Populated places in Andorra
Canillo